Movie is a video game written by Duško Dimitrijević for the ZX Spectrum and Amstrad CPC and was published by Imagine Software in 1986.

Plot

Movie is set in New York City in the 1930s. The player takes the role of Jack Marlow, a private investigator who must enter the headquarters of mob boss Bugs Malloy in order to retrieve an audiotape. In order to help him complete this task, Marlow needs the help of a girl called Tanya. Unfortunately, she has an identical twin called Vanya who is allied to Malloy and who will deliberately lead him into trouble.

Gameplay
The game is an arcade adventure which uses an isometric display to portray the action. Movement is achieved by rotating the main character and moving him forward, similar to that of Knightlore and other early examples of the genre. The player can also access a panel of icons which allow Marlow to carry out certain actions such as dropping and taking items, shooting his firearm, punching, throwing an item or talking. The latter is performed using speech bubbles in which the player can type out words and phrases using the keyboard.

External links 

M.O.V.I.E. Information

1986 video games
Amstrad CPC games
ZX Spectrum games
Video games developed in Serbia
Video games with isometric graphics
Video games set in the 1930s
Detective video games

Video games set in New York City
Single-player video games